The 1987–88 Minnesota North Stars season was the North Stars' 21st season. It saw the North Stars finish fifth in the Norris Division with a record of 19 wins, 48 losses, and 13 ties for 51 points — the worst record in the league.  They failed to make the Stanley Cup Playoffs for the second consecutive season. Despite finishing with the third-lowest winning percentage (at .319) and second-fewest wins in franchise history, they were actually still in contention for a playoff spot going into the last game of the season due to playing in an extremely weak Norris Division; the division champion Detroit Red Wings were the only team with a winning record.  The Stars lost to the Calgary Flames on the season's final day and finished last in scoring (242 goals for) and penalty-killing percentage (75.23%). The day before, the Toronto Maple Leafs, who were trailing the Stars for the fourth spot in the Norris as the day began, beat the Red Wings. This not only eliminated the Stars out of the playoffs, but also assured them of the worst record in the league.

The leading scorer for the North Stars in 1987–88 was Dino Ciccarelli. However, he became involved in controversy when, on January 6, 1988, he struck Toronto Maple Leafs defenceman Luke Richardson with his stick in a game at Maple Leaf Gardens in Toronto. Ciccarelli was arrested and charged with assault; he was eventually fined $1000 and sentenced to one day in jail.

Offseason

NHL Draft

Regular season

Final standings

Schedule and results

Player statistics

Forwards
Note: GP = Games played; G = Goals; A = Assists; Pts = Points; PIM = Penalty minutes

Defencemen
Note: GP = Games played; G = Goals; A = Assists; Pts = Points; PIM = Penalty minutes

Goaltending
Note: GP = Games played; W = Wins; L = Losses; T = Ties; SO = Shutouts; GAA = Goals against average

Playoffs
 The North Stars failed to qualify for the playoffs for the second consecutive season.

Awards and honors

References
 North Stars on Hockey Database

Minn
Minn
Minnesota North Stars seasons
Minnesota Twins
Minnesota Twins